A list of films produced in Egypt in 2010. For an A-Z list of films currently on Wikipedia, see :Category:Egyptian films.

References

External links 
 Egyptian films of 2010 at the Internet Movie Database
 Egyptian films of 2010 elCinema.com

Lists of Egyptian films by year
2010 in Egypt
Lists of 2010 films by country or language